Zafaran-e Olya (also Romanized as Za‘farān-e ‘Olyā; also known as Za‘farān) is a village in Mansuri Rural District, Homeyl District, Eslamabad-e Gharb County, Kermanshah Province, Iran. The population was 634 in 147 families as of the 2006 Census.

References 

Populated places in Eslamabad-e Gharb County